A Dreamer's Journey (Swedish: En drömmares vandring) is a 1957 Swedish biographical drama film directed by Lars-Magnus Lindgren and starring Jarl Kulle, Margit Carlqvist and Inga Landgré. It was shot at the Centrumateljéerna Studios in Stockholm. The film's sets were designed by the art director Nils Nilsson. It is based on the life of the poet Dan Andersson.

Cast
 Jarl Kulle as Dan Andersson
 Margit Carlqvist as 	Marja Lisa
 Inga Landgré as Ziri Stuart
 Georg Rydeberg as Hartmann
 Axel Slangus as 	Karigo
 Hugo Björne as 	Dan's Father
 Linnéa Hillberg as Dan's Mother
 Peter Lindgren as Anders Kolare
 Keve Hjelm as 	Karl-Anton
 Helge Hagerman as 	Vicar
 Olof Thunberg as 	Mr. Stuart
 David Erikson as 	Domkvist 
 Erik Hell as 	Erik Axel Blom
 Åke Fridell as Terje
 Jan-Olof Strandberg as 	Martinus
 Tord Stål as 	Publisher
 Brita Öberg as 	Old woman 
 Gregor Dahlman as 	Svarta Te
 John Norrman as 	Mats Kolare
 Jan Kings as Dan as a child
 Marina Stagh as Young Marja Lisa
 Jörgen Hasselblad as 	Young Karl-Anton
 Margareta Bergman as 	Vainos-Kari
 Otto Blixt as 	Varfors-Fredrik 
 Kurt Emke as Karis-Janken 
 Dan Eriksson as 	Charcoaler 
 Manne Grünberger as 	Music salesman 
 Karl-Erik Gustafsson a 	Björnbergs-Jon 
 Anton Hedlund as 	Charcoaler 
 Gunde Johansson as Charcoaler 
 Sven Melin as Mård-Jon 
 Margareta Palmgren as 	Girl at party 
 Nils Parling as 	Charcoaler 
 Inger Qvist as 	Girl at party 
 Olof Sandborg as 	Kettilä-Jerk 
 Else-Marie Sundin as 	Student 
 Bengt Sundmark as 	Jon Kolare 
 Måns Westfelt as Rev. Görelsson

References

Bibliography 
 Qvist, Per Olov & von Bagh, Peter. Guide to the Cinema of Sweden and Finland. Greenwood Publishing Group, 2000.

External links 
 

1957 films
Swedish drama films
1957 drama films
1950s Swedish-language films
Films directed by Lars-Magnus Lindgren
Films set in Stockholm
1950s Swedish films